Ramesh C. Juneja (born 28 July 1955) is an Indian businessman and the Chairman of Mankind Pharma. The company ranks in the top position in India in terms of prescription generated per doctor per month.

After completing his graduation in science, he started his career in 1974 with KeePharma Ltd., working as a medical representative. In 1975, he joined Lupin Limited and worked there as first line manager for almost 8 years.

In 1983, he resigned from Lupin and started his own company Bestochem in Partnership. In 1994, he withdrew his ownership from Bestochem and in 1995 incepted Mankind Pharma along with his younger brother Rajeev Juneja with an investment of  lakhs and an initial team of 25 Medical Representatives.

Under the supervision of Juneja, Mankind Pharma thrived from a  crores company in 1995 to a company having  crores in revenues by 2015.

Associations 
R. C. Juneja holds distinguished positions in various pharmaceutical bodies of India. He is the chairman of Federation of Pharma Entrepreneurs (FOPE) and is also the chairman of Himachal Pradesh – UK State Board for IDMA (Indian Drug Manufacturers Association).

Awards and achievements 
He was accorded with Business Icon Pharma Award by Network 18 in the year 2011. He was also one of the members out of the four business magnates nominated for ‘Business Leader of the Year Award’ in the 5th Annual Pharmaceutical Leadership Summit and Asia Business Leadership Award, 2012. He is one of the richest Indians as per Forbes List of Top 100 Richest Indians October, 2013.

References 

1955 births
Living people
Businesspeople from Delhi